Bangla Radio is a Bangladeshi FM radio station, the headquarter of the station is situated in Dhaka.
It has started broadcasting on 12 June 2016 with the aim to satisfy the soul of the listeners. In 2018 the FM station has signed an agreement with Voice Of America for broadcasting Voice Of America's programs.

References

2016 establishments in Bangladesh
Organisations based in Dhaka
Radio stations in Bangladesh
Mass media in Dhaka